Tsaghkut is a village in the Amasia Municipality of the Shirak Province of Armenia.

Demographics
According to the 1912 publication of Kavkazskiy kalendar, 365 people, mainly Karapapakhs, lived in the village of Gyullija in the Kars Okrug of the Kars Oblast.

The population of the village since 1886 is as follows:

References

Populated places in Shirak Province